In Greek mythology, Dimoetes (Ancient Greek: Διμοίτης) was a brother of Troezen, thus presumably a son of Pelops and Hippodamia. He was married to Evopis, daughter of Troezen.

Mythology 
Evopis was in love with her own brother and consorted with him despite being married to Dimoetes. Upon discovering this, Dimoetes reported the matter to Troezen. Evopis, in shame, cursed Dimoetes and hanged herself.

Not much later, Dimoetes found a dead body of an outstandingly beautiful woman washed up on the seashore, and was overcome with passion. The corpse, however, soon began to rot so he had to bury it. He piled up a tomb for the woman and then, unable to deal with his desire for her, killed himself.

Note

References 

Parthenius, Love Romances translated by Sir Stephen Gaselee (1882-1943), S. Loeb Classical Library Volume 69. Cambridge, MA. Harvard University Press. 1916.  Online version at the Topos Text Project.
Parthenius, Erotici Scriptores Graeci, Vol. 1. Rudolf Hercher. in aedibus B. G. Teubneri. Leipzig. 1858. Greek text available at the Perseus Digital Library.

Troezenian mythology
Princes in Greek mythology